Dato Chkhartishvili is a Georgian Greco-Roman wrestler. He is a bronze medalist at the European Wrestling Championships and the European Games.

Career 

At the 2018 European Wrestling Championships held in Kaspiysk, Russia, he won one of the bronze medals in the 60 kg event. In that same year, he also won one of the bronze medals in the men's 60 kg event at the 2018 European U23 Wrestling Championship held in Istanbul, Turkey.

In 2019, he represented Georgia at the 2019 European Games in Minsk, Belarus and he won one of the bronze medals in the 60 kg event. In May 2021, he failed to qualify for the 2020 Summer Olympics at the World Olympic Qualification Tournament held in Sofia, Bulgaria.

Major results

References

External links 
 

Living people
Year of birth missing (living people)
Place of birth missing (living people)
Male sport wrestlers from Georgia (country)
Wrestlers at the 2019 European Games
European Games medalists in wrestling
European Games bronze medalists for Georgia (country)
European Wrestling Championships medalists
21st-century people from Georgia (country)